The 1941 British Columbia general election was the twentieth general election in the Province of British Columbia, Canada. It was held to elect members of the Legislative Assembly of British Columbia. The election was called on September 9, 1941, and held on October 21, 1941.

After the election, a Coalition government was formed by the Conservative and Liberal members. Liberal Party leader Thomas Dufferin Pattullo objected, stepped down, and sat as a Liberal, giving the Coalition thirty two seats.

Results

Notes:

* Party did not nominate candidates in the previous election.

1 J. Hinchliffe was nominated by the North Vancouver Conservative Association but when he disagreed with the party's road policy, he was repudiated by the party leader, R.L. Maitland. A group called the Conservative Active Club nominated A. H. Bayne who was approved by Maitland. Bayne, however, could not run as a Conservative since Hinchliffe's nomination papers had been filed. Consequently, Hinchliffe's votes are included in the Conservative Party total and Bayne, who ran as an "Official Conservative", is listed separately.

Results by riding

|-
||    
|align="center"  |James Mowat
|align="center"  |AlberniLiberal
||    
||    
|align="center"  |BurnabyCCF
|align="center"  |Ernest Edward Winch
||    
|-
||    
|align="center"  |William James Asselstine
|align="center"  |AtlinLiberal
||    
||    
|align="center"  |ComoxCCF
|align="center"  |Colin Cameron
||    
|-
||    
|align="center"  |Louis LeBourdais
|align="center"  |CaribooLiberal
||    
||    
|align="center"  |Cowichan-NewcastleCCF
|align="center"  |Samuel Guthrie
||    
|-
||    
|align="center"  |Thomas King
|align="center"  |ColumbiaLiberal
||    
||    
|align="center"  |DeltaCCF
|align="center"  |Leonard Alec Shepherd
||    
|-
||    
|align="center"  |Henry George Thomas Perry
|align="center"  |Fort GeorgeLiberal
||    
||    
|align="center"  |MackenzieCCF
|align="center"  |Herbert Gargrave
||    
|-
||    
|align="center"  |Robert Henry Carson
|align="center"  |KamloopsLiberal
||    
||    
|align="center"  |North VancouverCCF
|align="center"  |Dorothy Steeves
||    
|-
||    
|align="center"  |Charles Sidney Leary
|align="center"  |Kaslo-SlocanLiberal
||    
||    
|align="center"  |Rossland-TrailCCF
|align="center"  |Herbert Wilfred Herridge
||    
|-
||    
|align="center"  |George Sharratt Pearson
|align="center"  |Nanaimo and the IslandsLiberal
||    
||    
|align="center"  |SimilkameenCCF
|align="center"  |Bernard George Webber
||    
|-
||    
|align="center"  |Frank Putnam
|align="center"  |Nelson-CrestonLiberal
||    
||    
|align="center" rowspan=2 |Vancouver-BurrardCCF
|align="center"  |Winona Grace MacInnis
||    
|-
||    
|align="center"  |Arthur Wellesley Gray
|align="center"  |New WestminsterLiberal
||    
||    
|align="center"  |Charles Grant MacNeil
||    
|-
||    
|align="center"  |Kenneth Cattanach MacDonald
|align="center"  |North OkanaganLiberal
||    
||    
|align="center" rowspan=2 |Vancouver CentreCCF
|align="center"  |Laura Emma Marshall Jamieson
||    
|-
||    
|align="center"  |Mark Matthew Connelly
|align="center"  |OminecaLiberal
||    
||    
|align="center"  |Wallis Walter LeFeaux
||    
|-
||    
|align="center"  |Glen Everton Braden
|align="center"  |Peace RiverLiberal
||    
||    
|align="center" rowspan=2 |Vancouver EastCCF
|align="center"  |James Lyle Telford
||    
|-
||    
|align="center"  |Thomas Dufferin Pattullo
|align="center"  |Prince RupertLiberal
||    
||    
|align="center"  |Harold Edward Winch2
||    
|-
||    
|align="center"  |Harry Johnston
|align="center"  |RevelstokeLiberal
||    
||    
|align="center"  |Chilliwack
|align="center"  |Leslie Harvey Eyres
||    
|-
||    
|align="center"  |Norman William Whittaker
|align="center"  |SaanichLiberal
||    
||    
|align="center"  |CranbrookConservative
|align="center"  |Frank William Green
||    
|-
||    
|align="center"  |Edward Tourtellotte Kenney
|align="center"  |SkeenaLiberal
||    
||    
|align="center"  |DewdneyConservative
|align="center"  |Roderick Charles MacDonald
||    
|-
||    
|align="center"  |John Hart 1
|align="center" rowspan=3 |Victoria CityLiberal
||    
||    
|align="center"  |EsquimaltConservative
|align="center"  |Elmer Victor Finland
||    
|-
||    
|align="center"  |Nancy Hodges
||    
||    
|align="center"  |Grand Forks-GreenwoodConservative
|align="center"  |Thomas Alfred Love
||    
|-
||    
|align="center"  |William Thomas Straith
||    
||    
|align="center"  |LillooetConservative
|align="center"  |Ernest Crawford Carson
||    
|-
||    
|align="center"  |John Joseph Alban Gillis
|align="center"  |YaleLiberal
||    
||    
|align="center"  |Oak BayConservative
|align="center"  |Herbert Anscomb
||    
|-
||    
|align="center"  |Thomas Aubert Uphill
|align="center"  |FernieLabour (Party)
||    
||    
|align="center"  |South OkanaganConservative
|align="center"  |William Andrew Cecil Bennett
||    
|-
||    
|align="center"  |Rolf Wallgren Bruhn
|align="center"  |Salmon ArmIndependent
||    
||    
|align="center" rowspan=3 |'''Vancouver-Point GreyConservative
|align="center"  |Royal Lethington Maitland
||    
|-
|
|
|
|
||    
|align="center"  |James Alexander Paton
||    
|-
|
|
|
|
||    
|align="center"  |Tilly Rolston
||    
|-
|
|align="center"|1  Premier-Elect and Incumbent
|
|
|
|align="center"|2  Leader of the Opposition
|
|
|-
|}
Sources:

1. Elections BC

2. SUMMARIES OF PROVINCIAL ELECTIONS AND BY-ELECTIONS, BRITISH COLUMBIA 1928 TO 1969.By: BRITISH COLUMBIA. CHIEF ELECTORAL OFFICER, Published: 1969,  McMaster University Government Publications.

See also
List of British Columbia political parties

1941
1941 elections in Canada
1941 in British Columbia
October 1941 events